A list of Venezuelan telenovelas.

A Calzón Quitao (Removed Outerwear)
A Todo Corazon (Every Heart)
Abandonada (Neglected)
Abigail 1988
Acorralada (Corraled)
Adorable Monica (Adorable  Monica)
Adriana
Alba Marina
Alejandra
Alma Mia 1988
Alondra
Amanda Sabater
Amantes de Luna Llena
Amantes (2005)
Amor Comprado (I Bought Myself A Love)
Amor a Palos (Love to Friends)
Amor de Abril (Love in the Month of April)
Amor de Papel (Love Made Out of Paper) 1993
Amor del Bueno (A Nice Love)
Amor Mio (My Dear)
Amor Sin Fronteras (Borderless Love)
Amores de Barrio Adentro (Inner-City Lovers)
Amores de Fin de Siglo (End-of-Century Lovers)
Anabel (Anabel)
Angel Rebelde (Out-of-Control Angel)
Angelica Pecado (Holy Sin)
Angelito  (Small Angel)
Ante la Ley (Above the Law)
Asi es la Vida (Life is This Way)
Atrévete (I Dare You To) 1986
Aunque me Cueste la Vida
Azucena
Bellisima (Extremely Beautiful)
Besame Tonto (Kiss Me, You Moron)
Bienvenida Esperanza (A Welcomed Hope)
Boves, El Urogallo (Boves, The Urogal)
Buenos Dias, Isabel (Good Day, Isabel)
Calypso (Calypso)
Camay (named by soap Camay of sponsor Procter & Gamble)
Cambio de Piel (Changing of the Skin)
Campeones (Champions)
Canaima(Canaima)
 La criada de la granja
Cantare para Ti (Would You Sing for Me?)
Cara Sucia (Dirty Face)
Caribe (Caribbean Sea)
Carissima (Charisma)
Carita Pintada (Picture Face)
Carmen Querida (Carmen, You Are Loved)
Carolina (Carolina)
Cazando a un Millonario (Wedding for a Millionaire)
Chao Cristina (See Ya, Christina)
Chinita, mi amor (Dear Chinita)
Cimarrón (Cimarron)
Claudia (Claudia)
Clemencia
Como Tu, Ninguna (Nobody Else Like You)
Con Toda el Alma
Contra Viento y Marea  (Against All Odds (Venezuela))
Cosita Rica
Cristal 1985
Cristina
Cuando el Cielo es Más Azul
Cuando Hay Pasion
Cumbres Borrascosas
Daniela
De Mujeres
De Oro Puro
De todas maneras Rosa
Destino de Mujer
Detrás del Telón
Doña Bárbara (1967-8)
Doña Bárbara (1975)
Dulce Amargo
Dulce Enemiga 1995
Dulce Ilusión
El Alma no tiene Color (A Colorless Soul)
El Amor las Vuelve Locas (Crazy In Love)
El Castillo de Hierro
El Derecho de Nacer
El Desafío
El Desprecio
El Engaño
El Esposo de Anaís
El gato tuerto 
El hombre de la máscara de hierro
El Pais de las Mujeres
El País Perdido
El Perdon de los Pecados
El Precio de Una Vida
El Primer Milagro
El Sol Sale Para Todos
Elizabeth
Emperatriz
Enamorada
Engañada
Enseñame a Querer
Entre Tu y Yo 1997
Entrega Total
Esmeralda
Estefania
Estrambotica Anastasia
Eva Marina
Fabiola
Felina
Federicco
Gardenia
Gata Salvaje ("Wild Cat")
Guayoyo Express 
Guerra de Mujeres
Guerreras y Centauros
Hay Amores Que Matan (Killer Lovers)
Hechizo de Amor
Historia de Tres Hermanas
Hoy te Vi
Ilusiones 1995
Ines Duarte, Secretaria 1991
Ifigenia
Juana la Virgen
Jugando a Ganar
Ka Ina 1995
Kapricho S.A.
Kassandra
Kiko Botones
La Balandra Isabel llegó esta tarde (The sloop "Isabel" came this afternoon)
La Comadre
La Cruz de Palo
La Cuaima (The Cuaima)
La Dama de Rosa 1986
La Doña Perfecta (The Perfect Housewife)
La Dueña
La Fiera
La Goajirita
La Hija de Juana Crespo
La historia de un Canalla (A Coward's Story)
La Indomable (The Undefeated)
La Inolvidable
La Intrusa 1986
La Invasora
La Italianita
La Mujer de Judas ("Wife of Judas") 2002
La Mujer de mi Vida
La mujer perfecta
La Mujer Prohibida ("Forbidden Woman") 1991
La Niña de mis ojos (My Beloved Girlfriend)
La Novela de Pasion (Passion Is A Soap Opera)
La Novela del Hogar (The Homemade Soap Opera)
La Novela LM  (LM, The Soap Opera)
La Novela Romantica (A Romantic Soap Opera)
La Pasion de Teresa 1989
La Potra Zaina
La Posada Maldita
La Revancha 1989, 2000
La Salvaje
La Señora de Cárdenas (Mr. Cárdenas' Woman)
La Señorita Elena
La Señorita Perdomo
La Soberana
La Sombra de Piera
La Tirana
La Trepadora
La Única
La usurpadora
Las Amazonas 1985
Las Bandidas
Las Gonzalez
Las Nuevas aventuras de Fredericco
Lejana Como el Viento (As Far As The Wind)
Leonela 1983
Ligia Elena
Los Amores de Anita Peña
Los Ojos que Vigilan (Spying Eyes)
Los Querendones (The Lucky Ones)
Luisa Fernanda
Luisana Mia
Luz Marina
Luz y Sombras
Mabel Valdez
Macarena
Mama Trompeta
Mambo y Canela
Maria Celeste 1994
Maria de los Angeles
Maria del Mar 1978
Maria Jose, oficios del hogar
Maria, Maria 1990
Maria Rosa, Buscame una Esposa
Mariana Montiel
Maribel
Marielena
Marisela
Mariú 1999
Marta y Javier 1983
Mas que Amor... Frenesi
Mi amada Beatriz 1987
Mi ex me tiene ganas
Mi Gorda Bella
Mi Hermano Satanas (My Satanic Brothers)
Mi Hijo Gabriel (My Son Gabriel)
Mi Nombre es Amor 1987
Mi Prima Ciela
Mi Secreto me Condena
Mi Vida Eres Tu
Mis Tres Hermanas
Morena Clara
Mujer con Pantalones
Mujer de Mundo
Mujer Secreta
Mundo de Fieras 1990
Muñeca de Trapo
Muñequita
Nacho
Natalia de 8 a 9
Negra Consentida
Niña Bonita 1988
Niña Mimada (The Girl Who Copies People)
Niño de Papel (The Paperboy)
Nunca te diré adiós
O.K.
Olvidarte Jamas
Palmolive
Paraiso 1989
Pasionaria 1990
Pecado de Amor 1996
Peligrosa
Peregrina
Piel de Sapa
Pobre Negro (Poor Negro)
Por Amarte Tanto
Por Estas Calles
Primavera
Pura Sangre
¡Qué buena se puso Lola! (How Good Lola Has It!))
¡Qué Clase de Amor!
Que Paso con Jacqueline? 1982
Quirpa de Tres Mujeres 1996
Rafaela
Raquel
Rebeca
Reina de Corazones
Renzo el Gitano
Roberta 1987
Rosa de la Calle 1982RosangelaRosangelicaRosarioRubi Rebelde 1989Sabor a Ti (The Taste of Your Lips)SabrinaSacrificio de Mujer (A Woman's Sacrifice)Samantha 1998Se Solicita Principe Azul (Prince Charming is Hanging Around)Secreto de AmorSelva, la Virgen de BarroSelva María 1987
Señora 1988
Ser bonita no basta
Silvia Rivas, divorciada
Sobre la Misma Tierra
Sol de Tentacion
Soltera y sin Compromiso
Soñar no Cuesta Nada (Costless Dreaming)
Sonia
Sor Alegría
Su Mala Hora
Tinieblas en el Corazón
Toda Mujer
Todo sobre Camila
Topacio 1985
Tormenta de Pasión
Tormento
Torrente
Trapos Íntimos
Tuya Para Siempre
TV Confidencial
Un Pedazo de Cielo
Una Muchacha llamada Milagros
Valentina
Valeria
Vidas Prestadas
Viva la Pepa (Pepa Rules!)
Volver a Vivir
Voltea Pa'Que te Enamores (Tip 'Cuz You're in Love With Me)
Vuelve Junto a Mi (Return To Me)
Y la Luna Tambien
Yo Compro a esa mujer

2010s

Co-productions

References

 
Venezuelan